The 2011 Dauphin Clinic Pharmacy Classic was held from December 2 to 5 at the Parkland Recreation Complex in Dauphin, Manitoba as part of the 2011–12 World Curling Tour. The purse for the event was CAD$30,000, and the winner, Brent Gedak, received CAD$8,000. The event was held in a triple knockout format.

Teams

Knockout results

A event

B event

C event

Playoffs

External links

Event Home Page

Dauphin Clinic Pharmacy Classic
Curling in Manitoba
Sport in Dauphin, Manitoba
December 2011 sports events in Canada